Trichadenia zeylanica is a species of plant in the Achariaceae family. It is endemic to Sri Lanka.

References

Endemic flora of Sri Lanka
zeylanica
Vulnerable plants
Taxonomy articles created by Polbot
Plants described in 1855